Institute of Telecommunications and Informatics of Turkmenistan is the largest institution of higher education in Turkmenistan, located in the capital of Ashgabat. Founded in 1992, prepares professionals and higher vocational education for railway transport and other sectors of the economy. Its rector was Nurnepes Annaevich Kuliev, until the university was abolished.

History 
Turkmen State Institute of Transport and Communications - forge highly qualified personnel for the entire system of transport and communications of the country. At the 4 faculties of the Institute trained more than 1,350 students. In the departments of the Institute has more than 140 faculty members.

In Ashgabat, September 1, 2009 was commissioned a new building of the Institute. The complex consists of a multi-storey office tower, eight academic buildings, several gyms.

Turkmen State Institute of Transport and Communications liquidated on June 12, 2019. Institute of Telecommunications and Informatics of Turkmenistan became its legal successor. The new university transfers to the jurisdiction of the Ministry of Education of Turkmenistan and designates it as the legal successor of the abolished Turkmen State Institute of Transport and Communications. Nurnepes Annaevich Kuliev became a rector of the new educational institution. He has held a similar position in the abolished institute.

Faculties 
The Institute of Telecommunications and Informatics has 5 faculties, which, in total, train in 21 specialties.

References

Links 
Official site

University and college buildings completed in 2009
Universities in Turkmenistan
Buildings and structures in Ashgabat
1992 establishments in Turkmenistan
Education in Turkmenistan
Educational organizations based in Turkmenistan
Educational institutions established in 1992